[[File:Life of William Penn's book art.jpg|alt=Life of William Penn's book art|thumb|Life of William Penns book art]]Mary Hughes (sometimes spelled Hughs), née Mary Robson''', was a British children's and Christian literature author.

Biography
She was born in Newcastle, England, and began writing children's books in 1811. Her first works, including Aunt Mary's Tales for the Entertainment and Improvement of Little Girls: Addressed to her Nieces, written in 1811, followed by Aunt Mary's Tales for the Entertainment and Improvement of Little Boys: Addressed to her Nephews in 1813, and The Ornaments Discovered in 1815, were all popular novels in England, so much so that they were also published abroad in the United States unbeknownst to Hughes. She also wrote several pamphlets for the Christian Tract Society, becoming a member for life in 1813.

She married Thomas Hughes, from Dundee, Scotland, in 1817, and the year after, emigrated to Philadelphia. When Mary Hughes arrived, she found that "the popularity of her books preceded her" and "commenced a school for young ladies" with the help of philanthropist John Vaughan Esq.

On the subject of the nameless school, Sarah Josepha Buell Hale, author of Woman's Record, states, "... it is believed few undertakings ever rose more rapidly in popularity, as many of the mothers of the present generation, in the most distinguished families in the city, can testify."

Hughes was also a frequent contributor to the publisher Lindsay and Blakiston. In The Mother's Birthday'', a Lindsay and Blakiston publisher advertisement writes, "Mrs. Hughs is well-known as one of our most popular contributors..." and "We are glad to see a lady of Mrs. Hughs' abilities so usefully employed."

After 21 years of running the school, in 1839, Mary Hughes and her husband Thomas retired to a farm in Doylestown, Bucks County, Pennsylvania.

List of attributed works

References 

19th-century British women writers
Date of death unknown
Date of birth unknown
Year of birth missing
Year of death missing